My Father's Violin is a 2022 Turkish film directed by Andaç Haznedaroğlu and starring Gülizar Nisa Uray, Engin Altan Düzyatan and Belçim Bilgin. The film was released on January 21, 2022, on Netflix.

Cast 
 Engin Altan Düzyatan as Mahir Mehmet
Belçim Bilgin as Suna
 Gülizar Nisa Uray as Özlem
 Selim Erdoğan as Ali Riza
 Ayfer Dönmez
 Yiğit Çakir
 Yener Sezgin
 Erdem Baş

References

External links 

 
 

Turkish-language Netflix original films
2020s Turkish-language films